Hook is an English surname, originating from people who lived in the bend of a lane or valley. Notable people with the surname include:

 Alfred Henry Hook (1850–1905), English recipient of the Victoria Cross
 Chris Hook (born 1968), American baseball player and coach
 Elias Hook (1805–1881), of E. and G.G. Hook & Hastings, American organ manufacturers
 Frank Eugene Hook (1893–1982), American politician
 Geoff "Jeff" Hook (born 1928), Australian cartoonist
 George Hook (born 1930), Irish journalist
 George Greenleaf Hook, (1807–1880), of E. and G.G. Hook & Hastings, American organ manufacturers
 Henry Hook, 1850–1905, English recipient of the Victoria Cross
 Hilary Hook (1918–1990), British soldier 
 Jake Hook, English songwriter and producer
 James Hook (born 1985), Welsh rugby player
 James Hook (1746–1827), English composer
 James Clarke Hook (1819–1907), English painter
 Jay Hook (born 1936), American baseball player
 Julian J. Hook (1941-2022), American lawyer and politician
 Peter Hook (born 1956) English musician
 Sidney Hook (1902–1989), American pragmatic philosopher
 Ted Hook (1910–1990), Australian public servant and lawyer
 Theodore Edward Hook (1788–1841), English author
 Walter Farquhar Hook (1798–1875), Victorian churchman

Fictional 
 Captain Hook, fictional character

See also 
 Hook (disambiguation)
 Hooke (disambiguation)
 Houk